Qumig, or Qumei ), is a village and township of Samzhubzê District (Shigatse City), in the Tibet Autonomous Region of China. , it had 18 villages under its administration.

References 

Township-level divisions of Tibet
Samzhubzê District